The women's team recurve competition at the 2019 European Games was held from 21 to 22 June 2019 at the Olympic Sports Complex in Minsk, Belarus.

Records
Prior to the competition, the existing world, European and Games records were as follows:

216 arrow ranking round

Ranking round
The ranking round took place on 21 June 2019 to determine the seeding for the knockout rounds.

Elimination rounds

References

Women's team recurve
2019 in women's archery